Todd Woodbridge and Mark Woodforde were the defending champions.

Woodbridge and Woodforde successfully defended their title, defeating Jan Apell and Jonas Björkman 6–3, 6–4 in the final.

Seeds
All seeds receive a bye into the second round.

Draw

Finals

Top half

Bottom half

References
Draw

Doubles